Roundhay Garden Scene is a  short silent motion picture filmed by French inventor Louis Le Prince at Oakwood Grange in Roundhay, Leeds, in northern England on 14 October 1888. It is believed to be the oldest surviving film. The camera used was patented in the United Kingdom on 16 November 1888.

Overview
According to Le Prince's son, Adolphe, Roundhay Garden Scene was made at Oakwood Grange, the home of Joseph and Sarah Whitley, in Roundhay, Leeds, West Riding of Yorkshire, Northern England, on 14 October 1888. The footage features Adolphe, his mother-in-law Sarah Whitley (née Robinson, 1816–1888), his father-in-law Joseph Whitley (1817–1891) and Annie Hartley in the garden of Oakwood Grange, leisurely walking around the garden of the premises. Sarah is seen walkingor dancingbackward as she turns around, and Joseph's coattails are seen flying as he also is turning. Joseph and Sarah Whitley were the parents of Le Prince's wife, Elizabeth. Annie Hartley is believed to be a friend of Le Prince and his wife. Sarah Whitley died ten days after the scene was filmed.

Oakwood Grange was demolished in 1972 and was replaced with modern housing; the only remains of it are the garden walls at the end of Oakwood Grange Lane. The adjacent stately home, Oakwood Hall, still remains as a nursing home.

Preservation
Roundhay Garden Scene was recorded on Eastman Kodak paper base photographic film using Le Prince's single-lens camera. In the 1930s, the National Science Museum (NSM) in London produced a photographic glass plate copy of 20 surviving frames from the original negative, before it was lost. The copied frames were later printed on 35 mm film. Adolphe stated that the Roundhay Garden sequence was shot at 12 frames per second (fps) and a second film, Traffic Crossing Leeds Bridge, at 20 fps; however, this is not borne out by analysis of the film, which suggests a frame rate of 7 fps for both, which was the speed of reproduction used in the 2015 documentary film about Le Prince, The First Film.

See also
 Passage de Vénus, 1874 series of photographs

References

External links 

 
 
 Roundhay Garden Scene on YouTube
 Denis Shiryaev's 60 fps color version on YouTube
 Louis Le Prince Centre for Cinema, Photography and Television University of Leeds. (The university is near to the site of Le Prince's former workshop which was located at the junction of Woodhouse Lane and Blackman Lane.)
 St John's of Roundhay. Details of memorial for Sarah (died 24 October 1888) and Joseph Whitley (died 12 January 1891) at St  John's  Church, Roundhay, Leeds. (map), Monumental Inscriptions (II1) at St. John's Church, Roundhay, Leeds

1888 films
1880s British films
1880s dance films
1880s short films
Articles containing video clips
British black-and-white films
British dance films
Films shot in Leeds
Films shot in Yorkshire
British silent short films
Films directed by Louis Le Prince
French black-and-white films
French dance films
French silent short films
Louis Le Prince films
Garden Scene, Roundhay